Jack Kaminer is an American former basketball coach. He spent 32 years coaching at the high school and college levels before retiring in 1997 and was named a league coach of the year 14 times by varying organizations. Kaminer took over the City College of New York (CCNY) men's basketball program in February 1971 after head coach David Polansky resigned. In his four years as CCNY's coach he compiled a record of 36 wins and 44 losses. In the early 1960s he played for Long Island University on a basketball scholarship.

Kaminar also coached at Wingate High School, Franklin K. Lane High School, Truman High School, and Scarsdale High School. He was inducted into the New York State Basketball Hall of Fame in 2002.

Head coaching record

College

References

Living people
American men's basketball coaches
American men's basketball players
Basketball players from New York (state)
CCNY Beavers men's basketball coaches
High school basketball coaches in New York (state)
LIU Brooklyn Blackbirds men's basketball players
Year of birth missing (living people)